The 2018–19 season is Rio Ave's eleventh season back in the Primeira Liga.

Season events
During the pre-season, manager Miguel Cardoso resigned on 13 June 2018, with José Gomes being appointed as his replacement the same day. Six months later, 22 December 2018, Gomes resigned to take the vacant manager's position at English Championship club Reading, with Daniel Ramos being appointed as his replacement on 1 January 2019.

Squad

Out on loan

Transfers

In

Loans in

Out

Loans out

Released

Competitions

Primeira Liga

Table

Result summary

Results

Taça de Portugal

Taça da Liga

Second round

Third round

UEFA Europa League

Qualifying rounds

Second qualifying round

Statistics

Appearances and goals

|-
|colspan="14"|Players away on loan:

|-
|colspan="14"|Players who left Rio Ave during the season:

|}

Goal scorers

Disciplinary record

References

Rio Ave F.C. seasons
Rio Ave